The Copenhagen Stocks House (Danish: Københavns Stokhus) was a prison in Copenhagen, Denmark, named for the stocks which used to be located at its premises. Originally a military prison, it was opened to civilian prisoners in 1741. The building was located on Øster Voldgade, opposite the present day National Gallery.

History

The Stocks House was built in 1677. Prior to that physical punishment had taken place at Jarmers Tower. The building was altered by Elias David Häusser between 1722 and 1724.

In 1741 the Stocks House was opened to civilian prisoners and it became a place for people who had been sentenced to "slavery", that is prisoners sentenced to penal labour in iron. A distinction was made between "honest" and "dishonest" prisoners, the latter being those who had been beaten at the whipping post  (Danish: Kag), a punishment which was not just corporal but associated with loss of honor.

In 1783 the institution was dramatically expanded when the Greater Stocks House, with a capacity for 600 "slaves", was opened next to the old building.

On 30 December 1771 the use of "severe examination" (torture) was abolished by Johann Friedrich Struensee but it was reintroduced after his fall. In 1837 torture was again abolished.

On 1 April 1860 the Stocks House was closed by the Ministry of Justice, prisoners were transferred to the Vridsløselille State Prison which had been constructed in accordance with the Philadelphia System. In 1929 the building is demolished when Polytechnical University of Denmark is expanded.

See also
 Copenhagen Court House

References

Defunct prisons in Denmark
Former buildings and structures in Copenhagen
1677 establishments in Denmark
1860 disestablishments
Buildings and structures completed in 1677
Buildings and structures demolished in 1929
Demolished buildings and structures in Denmark